Supercard of Honor X was a two-day professional wrestling live event produced by U.S. promotion Ring of Honor (ROH), which took place Friday, April 1 and Saturday, April 2, 2016, at the Hyatt Regency Dallas in Dallas, Texas. The events was the 10th Supercard of Honor.

Background
This professional wrestling event featured professional wrestling matches, which involve different wrestlers from pre-existing scripted feuds, plots, and storylines that played out on ROH's television programs. Wrestlers portrayed villains or heroes as they followed a series of events that built tension and culminated in a wrestling match or series of matches.

Matches

Night 1

Night 2

References

2016 in professional wrestling
Events in Dallas
2016 in Texas
ROH Supercard of Honor
Professional wrestling in the Dallas–Fort Worth metroplex